In 2016, the Australian radio station ABC Classic FM held the fourteenth of its annual Classic Music countdowns, during which the public voted for 100 favourite pieces. The chosen theme was "Voice" and included opera, operetta, choral music and classical song. The Classic 100 Voice countdown was broadcast in reverse order from 10 to 13 June.

Countdown results
The results of the countdown are as follows:

See also 
 Classic 100 Countdowns

References

External links 
 

Classic 100 Countdowns (ABC)
2016 in radio
2016 in Australian music